Vyacheslav Aleksandrovich Khovanskiy (born 3 December 1968 in Kamensk-Uralsky) is a former Russian football player.

References

1968 births
People from Kamensk-Uralsky
Living people
Soviet footballers
Russian footballers
FC Ural Yekaterinburg players
Russian Premier League players
Association football forwards
Sportspeople from Sverdlovsk Oblast